Ewa Durska (born 27 February 1977) is a Paralympian athlete from Poland competing mainly in category T20 shot put events. She is a two time Paralympic gold medalist in the shot put at the 2000 Games in Sydney and the 2012 Games in London. Her Paralympic career was put on hold after a sporting controversy at the 2000 Games saw her classification removed for the next two cycle of Paralympic Games. Durska is a world leader in her sport and is a four time World Championship gold medalist.

References

External links 
 

Paralympic athletes of Poland
Athletes (track and field) at the 2000 Summer Paralympics
Athletes (track and field) at the 2012 Summer Paralympics
Paralympic gold medalists for Poland
Living people
Polish female shot putters
World record holders in Paralympic athletics
1977 births
People from Nowogard
Medalists at the 2000 Summer Paralympics
Medalists at the 2012 Summer Paralympics
Paralympic medalists in athletics (track and field)